Greer Barnes (born November 5, 1987) is an American soccer defender who last played for FC Gold Pride of Women's Professional Soccer.

Career statistics

Club career

References

 FC Gold Pride player profile
 West Virginia player profile
 West Virginia statistics

1987 births
Living people
West Virginia Mountaineers women's soccer players
Women's association football defenders
FC Gold Pride players
People from Rye, New York
American women's soccer players
Women's Professional Soccer players